The Roy J. Carver Charitable Trust is a philanthropic group dedicated to the state of Iowa and, to a lesser extent, Illinois.  It disburses about $15M annually. Most of the funding is directed to education and to biomedical research.  The Roy J. and Lucille A. Carver College of Medicine is supported by this foundation.

References

Medical and health foundations in the United States
Educational foundations in the United States